The Libyan CrisisFadel, L. "Libya's Crisis: A Shattered Airport, Two Parliaments, Many Factions".  refers to the current humanitarian crisis and political-military instability occurring in Libya, beginning with the Arab Spring protests of 2011, which led to a civil war, foreign military intervention, and the ousting and death of Muammar Gaddafi. The civil war's aftermath and proliferation of armed groups led to violence and instability across the country, which erupted into renewed civil war in 2014. The crisis in Libya has resulted in tens of thousands of casualties since the onset of violence in early 2011. During both civil wars, the output of Libya's economically crucial oil industry collapsed to a small fraction of its usual level, with most facilities blockaded or damaged by rival groups, despite having the largest oil reserves of any African country. On October 23, 2020, parties signed a permanent ceasefire.

Background

The history of Libya under Muammar Gaddafi spanned 42 years from 1969 to 2011. Gaddafi became the de facto leader of the country on 1 September 1969 after leading a group of young Libyan military officers against King Idris I in a nonviolent revolution and bloodless coup d'état. After the king had fled the country, the Libyan Revolutionary Command Council (RCC) headed by Gaddafi abolished the monarchy and the old constitution and proclaimed the new Libyan Arab Republic, with the motto "freedom, socialism, and unity".

After coming to power, the RCC government took control of all petroleum companies operating in the country and initiated a process of directing funds toward providing education, health care and housing for all. Despite the reforms not being entirely effective, public education in the country became free and primary education compulsory for both sexes. Medical care became available to the public at no cost, but providing housing for all was a task that the government was not able to complete. Under Gaddafi, per capita income in the country rose to more than US$11,000, the fifth-highest in Africa. The increase in prosperity was accompanied by a controversial foreign policy and increased political repression at home.

Conflicts

First civil war

In early 2011, a civil war broke out in the context of the wider "Arab Spring". The anti-Gaddafi forces formed a committee named the National Transitional Council, on 27 February 2011. It was meant to act as an interim authority in the rebel-controlled areas. After the government began to roll back the rebels and a number of atrocities were committed by both sides, a multinational coalition led by NATO forces intervened on 21 March 2011, ostensibly to protect civilians against attacks by the government's forces. Shortly thereafter, the International Criminal Court issued an arrest warrant against Gaddafi and his entourage on 27 June 2011. Gaddafi was ousted from power in the wake of the fall of Tripoli to the rebel forces on 20 August 2011, although pockets of resistance held by forces loyal to Gaddafi's government held out for another two months, especially in Gaddafi's hometown of Sirte, which he declared the new capital of Libya on 1 September 2011. His Jamahiriya regime came to an end the following month, culminating on 20 October 2011 with Sirte's capture, NATO airstrikes against Gaddafi's escape convoy, and his killing by rebel fighters.

Post-revolution armed groups and violence

The Libyan revolution led to defected regime military members who joined rebel forces, revolutionary brigades that defected from the Libyan Army, post-revolutionary brigades, militias, and various other armed groups, many composed of ordinary workers and students. Some of the armed groups formed during the war against the regime and others evolved later for security purposes. Some were based on tribal allegiances. The groups formed in different parts of the country and varied considerably in size, capability, and influence. They were not united as one body, but they were not necessarily at odds with one another. Revolutionary brigades accounted for the majority of skilled and experienced fighters and weapons. Some militias evolved from criminal networks to violent extremist gangs, quite different from the brigades seeking to provide protection.

After the first Libyan civil war, violence occurred involving various armed groups who fought against Gaddafi but refused to lay down their arms when the war ended in October 2011. Some brigades and militias shifted from merely delaying the surrender of their weapons to actively asserting a continuing political role as "guardians of the revolution", with hundreds of local armed groups filling the complex security vacuum left by the fall of Gaddafi. Before the official end of hostilities between loyalist and opposition forces, there were reports of sporadic clashes between rival militias and vigilante revenge killings.

In dealing with the number of unregulated armed groups, the National Transitional Council called for all armed groups to register and unite under the ministry of defense, thus placing many armed groups on the payroll of the government. This gave a degree of legitimacy to many armed groups, including General Khalifa Haftar who registered his armed group as the "Libyan National Army", the same name he used for his anti-Gaddafi forces after the 1980s Chadian–Libyan conflict.

On 11 September 2012, militants allied with Al-Qaeda attacked the US consulate in Benghazi, killing the US ambassador and three others. This prompted a popular outcry against the semi-legal militias that were still operating, and resulted in the storming of several Islamist militia bases by protesters. A large-scale government crackdown followed on non-sanctioned militias, with the Libyan Army raiding several now-illegal militias' headquarters and ordering them to disband. The violence eventually escalated into the second Libyan civil war.

Second civil war

The second Libyan civil war was a conflict among rival groups seeking control of the territory of Libya. The conflict has been mostly between the government of the House of Representatives, also known as the "Tobruk government", which was assigned as a result of a very low-turnout elections in 2014 and was internationally recognized as the "Libyan Government" until the establishment of GNA; and the rival Islamist government of the General National Congress (GNC), also called the "National Salvation Government", based in the capital Tripoli. In December 2015, these two factions agreed in principle to unite as the Government of National Accord. Although the Government of National Accord is now functioning and is backed by the UN, its authority is still unclear as specific details acceptable to both sides have not yet been agreed upon.

The Tobruk government, strongest in eastern Libya, has the loyalty of Haftar's Libyan National Army and has been supported by air strikes by Egypt and the UAE. The Islamist government of the GNC, strongest in western Libya, rejected the results of the 2014 election, and is led by the Muslim Brotherhood, backed by the wider Islamist coalition known as "Libya Dawn" and other militias, and aided by Qatar, Sudan, and Turkey.

In addition to these, there are also smaller rival groups: the Islamist Shura Council of Benghazi Revolutionaries, led by Ansar al-Sharia (Libya), which has had the support of the GNC; the Islamic State of Iraq and the Levant's (ISIL's) Libyan provinces; as well as Tuareg militias of Ghat, controlling desert areas in the southwest; and local forces in Misrata District, controlling the towns of Bani Walid and Tawergha. The belligerents are coalitions of armed groups that sometimes change sides.

Since 2015, there have been many political developments. The United Nations brokered a cease-fire in December 2015, and on 31 March 2016 the leaders of a new UN-supported "unity government" arrived in Tripoli. On 5 April, the Islamist government in western Libya announced that it was suspending operations and handing power to the new unity government, officially named the "Government of National Accord", although it was not yet clear whether the new arrangement would succeed. On 2 July, rival leaders reached an agreement to reunify the eastern and western managements of Libya's National Oil Corporation (NOC). As of 22 August, the unity government still had not received the approval of Haftar's supporters in the Tobruk government, and on 11 September the general boosted his political leverage by seizing control of two key oil terminals. Haftar and the NOC then reached an agreement for increasing oil production and exports, and all nine of Libya's major oil terminals were operating again in January 2017.

In December 2017, the Libyan National Army seized Benghazi after three years of fighting. In February 2019, the LNA achieved victory in the Battle of Derna. The LNA then launched a major offensive in April 2019 in an attempt to seize Tripoli. On 5 June 2020, the GNA captured all of western Libya, including the capital Tripoli. The next day the GNA launched an offensive to capture Sirte. However, they proved unable to advance. On 21 August, the GNA and the LNA both agreed to a ceasefire. Khalifa Haftar, Field Marshal of the LNA, rejected the ceasefire and LNA spokesman Ahmed al-Mismari dismissed the GNA's ceasefire announcement as a ploy. On 23 August, street protests took place in Tripoli, where hundreds protested against the GNA for living conditions and corruption within the government.

Socioeconomic impact 

Due to the crisis, Libya has lost its status when they maintained a high human development index (HDI), and no longer has one of the highest HDI rankings among countries in Africa. The war has caused a significant loss of economic potential in Libya, estimated at 783.2 billion Libyan dinars from 2011 to 2021.

See also 
Yemeni Crisis (2011–present)
Egyptian Crisis (2011–2014)
Venezuelan Crisis (2010–present)
Iraqi conflict (2003–present)

References

 
2011 in Libya
2010s in Libya
2020s in Libya
2010s conflicts
2020s conflicts
Arab Winter in Libya
Military history of Libya
Political history of Libya